The Autumn Sun  (foaled 2 September 2015) was a Thoroughbred racehorse trained and bred in Australia. He won five Group One races and over three million dollars.

Career
The Autumn Sun was purchased for $650,000 at the 2016 Inglis Easter Yearling Sale. Olly Koolman of Hermitage said, "We went with the plan to buy a Derby winner. Guy Mulcaster identified him and had him on a shortlist. He was one of the first through the ring on that list and we bought confidently with him."

From December 2017, The Autumn Sun had 4 trials before he made his debut at Royal Randwick on 25 April 2018. Trapped 3 wide, he took the lead with 100 metres left in an "eye-catching debut". A month later, he won his second race at Randwick, where it was said, "the further the race went the more decisive and dominant he became."

On 9 June, The Autumn Sun won The J. J. Atkins, coming from 6 lengths back to win. Trainer Chris Waller said, "I was questioning whether at only his third start, like State of Origin, only certain people and horses can take those steps. We just said if things work out and if he’s as good as we think he is, he could win the J.J. Atkins."

After three months spell, The Autumn Sun had two Sydney trials in August 2018. Next was the Group 2 Stan Fox Stakes, where he failed to win for the first time. In a "horror story", he was trapped on the rail and blocked for a run, eventually finishing third. Jockey Kerrin McEvoy considered protesting against the winner for interference. Waller said, "He was very unlucky, we will leave it at that."

A fortnight later, The Autumn Sun won his second Group 1, the Golden Rose Stakes. McEvoy said, "I was bit worried when I got to the outside at 350m. I was still last then, but in 10 strides I knew he was the winner. To be doing that to a very good group of colts at what I consider his minimum distance is amazing. Wait until he gets to a mile and 2000m – he is going to get much better." The Sydney Morning Herald described him as, "already the best colt of his generation".

A further Group 1 was won two weeks later in the Caulfield Guineas. Jumping as $1.70 favourite, he settled in a poor position, but "romped away to win in stunning fashion" to win by four and a half lengths. Jockey James Mcdonald said, "He is still a baby. I wanted to be wide with cover but he jumped too well, he was first out and he has never done that in his life. I was worried – of course – I could feel the hands of the punters getting tighter and tighter around my neck."

Spelled for 4 months, The Autumn Sun returned in the Group 2 Hobartville Stakes in February 2019. Punters.com.au said, "After a spring in which he cemented himself as the star three-year-old in Australia, The Autumn Sun's much-anticipated return has followed the script at Rosehill. The nation's most valuable colt came from last to win, overhauling previously unbeaten Vegadaze by a long neck."

On 9 March in the Randwick Guineas against a field of 9 including Nakeeta Jane (winner of the 2019 Surround Stakes and 2019 Light Fingers Stakes) and Miss Fabulass (2018 Tea Rose Stakes) he was about 10 lengths off Miss Fabulass passing the 400m mark. The Autumn Sun was always getting closer to the leader through the straight and at the post The Autumn Sun crossed first winning by a head to Fundamentalist. He also equalled the race record of Kementari who won in 2018 with a time of 1:33.72 which gave him his 4th Group One race and 4th consecutive win since his 3rd in the Stan Fox Stakes.

Stud
In April 2019, The Autumn Sun was retired to stud, with a service fee of $77,000. Hermitage Thoroughbreds and Arrowfield Stud released a statement saying, "After extensive discussions, the opportunity to return the colt to his spiritual home and fill the gap left by the death of Redoute's Choice provide too compelling."

References

2015 racehorse births
Racehorses bred in Australia
Racehorses trained in Australia